Perst or Persatuan Sepakbola Tabanan is a football club in Bali. It is headquartered in Tabanan, Bali. The club competes in Liga 3 and plays at the Debes Stadium.

References

External links 
 

Football clubs in Indonesia
Football clubs in Bali
Association football clubs established in 1938
1938 establishments in the Dutch East Indies